Bargischow is a municipality in the Vorpommern-Greifswald district, in Mecklenburg-Vorpommern, Germany.

Location
The railway route between Berlin and Stralsund crosses between the municipality and Woserow.

Geography and transport

Location 
The municipality of Bargischow lies about 5 kilometres east of the Hanseatic town of Anklam. To the west the municipality borders immediately on the borough of Anklam. To the north, the Peene, which empties into the Peenestrom, forms the boundary. To the east, the municipality's peninsula of Anklamer Fähre borders on the Stettin Lagoon, which unites with the Peenestrom in the northeast. To the southeast is the  Anklamer Torfmoor. The municipality of Bugewitz borders in the southeast on Neu Kosenow and in the south on Bargischow.

Transport 
The Berlin–Stralsund line crosses the municipal area between Bargischow and Woserow, whilst the B 109 federal road passes west of Woserow.

References

Vorpommern-Greifswald